Renan Rodrigues da Silva, known as Renan Foguinho (born 9 October 1989) is a Brazilian footballer who plays as a defensive midfielder.

Career

Career statistics
(Correct )

Honours

Sul-americano: 2004
Jogos da Juventude: 2005–06
Taça BH: 2006
Campeonato Paranaense: 2009
Copa Tribuna de Futebol Junior: 2009

International
Brazil U-20
Torneio Hexagonal Internacional da Venezuela: 2009

References

External links
 ogol.com

1989 births
Living people
Sportspeople from Londrina
Brazilian footballers
Brazil under-20 international footballers
Brazilian expatriate footballers
Expatriate footballers in Belarus
Expatriate footballers in Turkey
Campeonato Brasileiro Série A players
TFF First League players
Club Athletico Paranaense players
FC Dinamo Minsk players
Atlético Clube Goianiense players
Esporte Clube XV de Novembro (Piracicaba) players
Adanaspor footballers
Giresunspor footballers
Clube Náutico Capibaribe players
Association football midfielders